The Rudolf Kunze Barn, in Twin Falls County, Idaho near Buhl, Idaho, was built in 1915.  It was listed on the National Register of Historic Places in 1983, then removed in 1989 in a procedural error, then relisted in 1994.

It is a two-story balloon frame gambrel-roofed dairy barn.

It is located about two miles northeast of Buhl.

References

Barns on the National Register of Historic Places in Idaho
National Register of Historic Places in Twin Falls County, Idaho
Buildings and structures completed in 1915